Robert Middleton (born Samuel G. Messer; May 13, 1911 – June 14, 1977) was an American film and television actor known for his large size, beetle-like brows, and a deep, booming voice (for which he was known as "Big Bob Middleton"), usually in the portrayal of ruthless villains.

Early years 
A native of Cincinnati, Ohio, Middleton was one of four children of a building contractor. He trained for a musical career at the Cincinnati Conservatory of Music and Carnegie Tech in Pittsburgh, Pennsylvania.

Career
Middleton's career in entertainment began with a job as an announcer on WLW radio in Cincinnati. He worked steadily as a radio announcer and actor.

One of his early works was as the narrator of the educational film "Duck and Cover".  After appearing on the Broadway stage and live television, Middleton began appearing in films in 1954, and in film opposite Humphrey Bogart in The Desperate Hours (1955), Danny Kaye in The Court Jester (1955), Gary Cooper in Friendly Persuasion (1956), Richard Egan and Elvis Presley in Love Me Tender (1956), Dorothy Malone and Robert Stack in The Tarnished Angels (1958), Robert Taylor and Richard Widmark in The Law and Jake Wade (1958), and Dean Martin in Career (1959).

Middleton appeared in many television programs in the 1950s and 1960s, including the CBS anthology series Appointment with Adventure. He played a dishonest candidate for the United States House of Representatives in an episode of ABC's The Real McCoys, starring Walter Brennan and Richard Crenna. In the story line, Middleton falsely claimed to have previously been a farmer in a bid for the farm vote. Middleton was cast as "The Tichborne Claimant" in the NBC anthology series The Joseph Cotten Show. 

In 1956, he guest starred on James Arness’s TV Western series Gunsmoke, playing the title character in the episode “Dutch George” (S1E32), a flamboyant career horse thief who was friends with Matt Dillon in their wilder younger days (this episode unveiled some of Dillon’s shadier past, once being a young man who also might have stolen, who at a yet to be revealed crossroad in life, opted to be a lawman).  In 1961, he was cast as Arthur Sutro in the episode "The Road to Jericho" of the ABC western series, The Rebel, starring Nick Adams, and guest-starred in the episode "A Man of Means" of the short-lived crime adventure-drama series The Investigators, starring James Franciscus and James Philbrook. 

Middleton was cast in ten episodes of  the ABC family western drama, The Monroes, with costars Michael Anderson, Jr., and Barbara Hershey. In 1963 he portrayed Josh Green in the episode "Incident of the Mountain Man" on CBS's Rawhide.

Among his several appearances in the long-running Alfred Hitchcock Presents, he portrayed a gangster in high places, Mr. Koster, in the 1956 episode "The Better Bargain".  In 1958, he played the villain in the first episode of NBC's Bat Masterson western series, starring Gene Barry in the title role. He appeared in four episodes of The Untouchables, including the 2 part episode, "The Unhired Assassin", as Chicago mayor Anton Cermak. In 1961, he appeared in the episode "Accidental Tourist" on the James Whitmore ABC legal drama The Law and Mr. Jones. That same year, he portrayed the highly sympathetic but fiercely dedicated state executioner in an episode of Thriller (U.S. TV series) entitled "Guillotine". He also appeared in three episodes of Bonanza from 1960 to 1967, as brutal gangster Sam Bryant. Middleton appeared as defendant "Judge Daniel Redmond" in the 1963 Perry Mason episode, "The Case of the Witless Witness". In the early 1950s, Middleton appeared on Broadway in Ondine (1954), A Red Rainbow (1953), and The Wild Duck (1951). Other significant film roles included The Court Jester (1955) as a grim and determined knight who jousts with Danny Kaye in the famous "pellet with the poison" sequence, and as Edwin M. Stanton in The Lincoln Conspiracy (1977). In between, he played an array of brutish mountain men, corrupt cigar-biting town bosses and lynch mob leaders.  Middleton guest-starred on Get Smart as the KAOS villain "The Whip", intent on hypnotizing Agent 86 in the 1970 series finale "I Am Curiously Yellow".

Personal life and death
On July 14, 1951, Middleton married in Cincinnati; he and his wife, Roberta, separated on September 5, 1955. They had two sons, who were the subjects of a custody hearing on February 15, 1956. He sought custody in the divorce suit, charging that she had a romantic relationship with his cousin.

Middleton died on June 14, 1977, in Encino, California, at the age of 66.

Selected filmography

The Silver Chalice (1954) – Idbash
The Big Combo (1955) – Police Capt. Peterson
The Desperate Hours (1955) – Sam Kobish
Trial (1955) – A.A. 'Fats' Sanders
The Court Jester (1955) – Sir Griswold
Red Sundown (1956) – Rufus Henshaw
The Proud Ones (1956) – Honest John Barrett
Friendly Persuasion (1956) – Sam Jordan
Love Me Tender (1956) – Mr. Siringo
The Lonely Man (1957) – Ben Ryerson
So Lovely... So Deadly (1957) – Eddie Rocco
The Tarnished Angels (1957) – Matt Ord
The Walter Winchell File "The Law and Aaron Benjamin" (1957) – Aaron Benjamin
Day of the Badman (1958) – Charlie Hayes
The Law and Jake Wade (1958) – Ortero
No Place to Land (1958) – Buck LaVonne
Don't Give Up the Ship (1959) – Vice Adm. Philo Tecumseh Bludde
Career (1959) – Robert Kensington
Hell Bent for Leather (1960) – Ambrose
The Great Impostor (1961) – R.C. Brown
Gold of the Seven Saints (1961) – Amos Gondora
Cattle King (1963) – Clay Mathews
For Those Who Think Young (1964) – Burford Sanford Cronin
A Big Hand for the Little Lady (1966) – Dennis Wilcox
The Cheyenne Social Club (1970) – Barkeeper – Great Plains Saloon
Which Way to the Front? (1970) – Colonico
Even Angels Eat Beans (1973) – Angelo
The Harrad Experiment (1973) – Sidney Bower
The Lincoln Conspiracy (1977) – Edwin M. Stanton

References

External links

 
 
 
 
  (interviewed in Cincinnati – 1959)

1911 births
1977 deaths
20th-century American male actors
American male film actors
American male television actors
Male Western (genre) film actors
Male actors from Cincinnati
Male actors from Los Angeles
Male actors from Ohio
University of Cincinnati – College-Conservatory of Music alumni
Western (genre) television actors